The Ferst Center for the Arts, located in Atlanta, Georgia, is Georgia Tech's theater and arts center and is adjacent to DramaTech, the student-run theater. It contains a 950-seat auditorium that features a proscenium stage, orchestra pit, and theatrical lighting and sound systems.

History
The center opened in April 1992 with the name Georgia Tech Theatre for the Arts. It was renamed in honor of Robert H. Ferst, a Georgia Tech alumnus, following a $1 million donation by his widow, Jeanne Rolfe Ferst.

On October 13, 1992, shortly after its opening, it served as the venue for the Vice Presidential debate between Al Gore, Dan Quayle, and James Stockdale.

References

External links

Official website

Georgia Tech buildings and structures
Theatres in Atlanta
Art museums and galleries in Georgia (U.S. state)
Arts centers in Georgia (U.S. state)
Performing arts centers in Georgia (U.S. state)
University and college arts centers in the United States